The Montague Nuclear Power Plant was a proposed nuclear power plant to be located in Montague, Massachusetts. The plant was to consist of two 1150 MWe General Electric boiling water reactors. The project was proposed in 1973 and canceled in 1980, after $29 million was spent on the project.

On 22 February 1974, Washington's Birthday, organic farmer Sam Lovejoy took a crowbar to the weather-monitoring tower which had been erected at the site on the Montague Plains.  Lovejoy felled 349 feet of the 550-foot tower and then took himself to the local police station, where he presented a statement in which he took full responsibility for the action. Lovejoy went on trial in September 1974 on charges of malicious destruction, but was acquitted on a technicality. Lovejoy's action galvanized local public opinion against the plant which ended the project entirely.

In 1975, Lovejoy made the first documentary film to emerge on the anti-nuclear movement, and Lovejoy's story, called Lovejoy's Nuclear War. He later helped to form the Clamshell Alliance anti-nuclear group. In 1977, the Clamshell Alliance was involved in a series of mass protests against utilities attempting to build nuclear power plants, occupying the proposed site of the Seabrook nuclear power reactor in New Hampshire. This series of protests, which resulted in 1,400 arrests, inspired nuclear opposition groups in other parts of the United States.

A total of 63 nuclear units were canceled in the USA between 1975 and 1980. Many nuclear plant proposals were no longer viable due to the downturn of electricity demand increases, significant cost and time overruns, and more complex regulatory requirements.  Also, there was considerable public opposition to nuclear power in the US by this time.

See also

Anti-nuclear protests in the United States
List of books about nuclear issues
List of canceled nuclear plants in the United States
Nuclear power debate
Nuclear power in the United States
Allen Young (writer)

References

Cancelled nuclear power stations in the United States
Montague, Massachusetts
Nuclear power plants in Massachusetts
Anti–nuclear power movement
Anti-nuclear movement in the United States